Cantabrian cuisine includes seafood from the Cantabrian Sea, salmon and trout from the upper basins of the rivers, vegetables and dairy products from the valleys, and veal and game from the Cantabrian mountains.

Fish and seafood

Seafood is widely used, from the entire coast and the Bay of Santander in particular, including clams, mussels, pod razors, cockles, crabs, barnacles, crayfish, snails, lobster, and squid. Fish include sea bass, hake, scorpion fish, anchovy, sardine, and albacore.

The albacore or bonito del norte is used in one of the most typical dishes of the region: marmita or sorropotún. Some of the most renowned Cantabrian dishes are hake in green sauce (merluza en salsa verde), squid with onions (maganos encebollados) and cuttlefish in its ink sauce (cachon en su tinta), and clam casserole. "Rabas" (Squid sticks deep fried) is the most popular snack in the coast, typically companied with a white wine or a vermouth.

Processed anchovies from the town of Santoña are highly appreciated and have a first class reputation worldwide.

Meats
Veal is widely consumed, often from the Tudanca cattle. The National Cattle Fair of Torrelavega, the largest cattle fair in Spain, is held in Cantabria. Game is also of high quality: deer, roe deer, and wild boar. Pork is a key element for the cocido montañés, literally 'mountain stew', with beans, cabbage, and other ingredients.

Pastry
Cantabrian pastries include the traditional sobaos and quesada pasiega. Puff pastry is widely used, with different names in different regions: corbatas in Unquera and San Vicente de la Barquera, polkas in Torrelavega, and sacristanes in Liérganes. Other notables sweets are s and canónigos, both of Liébana; corazones of Liérganes, the palucos of Cabezón de la Sal; and the tortos and pantortillas of Reinosa. Other desserts not of Cantabrian origin are rice pudding, natillas, leche frita, and fruit jams.

Alcoholic beverages
Orujo is the Cantabrian pomace brandy.
Historically, cider and chacoli or txakoli wine were a specialty; after a major and long-term decline, they are recovering.

Two Spanish wines (vinos de la tierra) with denominación de origen calificada (protected geographical status) from Canabria are Costa de Cantabria and Liébana, named after the localities of their production.

References

 
Spanish cuisine